Golmud, also known by various other romanizations, is a county-level city in the Haixi Mongol and Tibetan Autonomous Prefecture of Qinghai Province, China. It is now the second-largest city in Qinghai and the third largest in the Tibetan Plateau (after Xining and Lhasa). The population in 2020 is 221,863.

Name
Golmud is a romanization of a Mongolian word meaning "rivers". Ge'ermu is the pinyin romanization of the Mandarin pronunciation of the same name's transcription into Chinese characters; it is sometimes misspelled Geermu. Ko-erh-mu was the same name romanized using the Wade–Giles system; Golmot was the romanization used by the Chinese Postal Map. The Wylie romanization of the Tibetan form of the name is Nagormo.

Geography
Golmud is part of Haixi Prefecture in western Qinghai Province. Despite being nominally a "city", the built-up urban area of Golmud comprises only  of the county's . Most of the county lies in the southern Qaidam Basin and in the foothills of the Kunlun Mountains. A large southern exclave is administered as the "town" of Tanggula, separated from the rest of the county by the western panhandle of the Yushu Tibetan Autonomous Prefecture. The northern part borders Xinjiang to its northwest; the southern exclave borders the Tibetan Autonomous Region to its southwest.

It grew up alongside the Golmud River, which gave it its name.

North of Golmud is the Qarhan Playa, a  salt flat with about ten perennial salt lakes. The largest is Dabusun Lake, which receives the waters of the Golmud. The more important smaller lakes are Suli, South Suli, Dabiele, Xiaobiele, Tuanjie, Xiezuo, Dongling, and North and South Hulsan, which receive the waters of smaller inflowing streams. Qarhan is part of the larger Sanhu Depression, which includes East and West Taijinar Lakes.

Climate
Golmud has a cold arid climate (Köppen BWk), with long, cold winters, and warm summers. Relative humidity averages only 32%, with all months below 40%, some of the lowest levels nationally. With monthly percent possible sunshine ranging from 62% in July to 81% in November, the city receives 3,096 hours of bright sunshine annually.

History 
Golmud is a rather young city. It was first established in 1954 when the Transportation regiments of Qinghai-Tibet Corps set up a food distribution base, staffed by 10 people, at the current location, and in May of that year, construction on the  Qinghai-Tibet Highway commenced. Scientific exploration of the mineral resources of Qarhan were undertaken in the 1950s, leading to the discovery of the area's potash and gas fields. Systematic surveying was undertaken in the 1960s and 1970s, with the railway permitting industrial exploitation from the 1980s. The first oil pipeline and potassium fertilizer factory were opened in 1989. The  Golmud Kunlun Economic Development Zone was opened in 1992. In 2004, a second pipeline arrived. In the 2010s, an influx of further investment followed realization of the importance of the Sanhu's supplies of lithium and rare earths for modern personal electronics and electric cars. In 2016, over 85% of goods movement with Tibet passed through Golmud.

Administrative divisions 
Subdistricts:
 
 
 
 
 

Towns:
 Tanggula (གདང་ལ་)
 

Townships:
 
 

Demographics 
In 2017, the population of the total area of Golmud was approximately 240,494. A 2018 publication by the National Ethnic Affairs Commission reported that ethnic Han Chinese comprise 69.82% of the city's population, and minority ethnic groups comprise 30.18%. The city's is home to 33 ethnic minorities, of which, the largest are the Mongols, Tibetans, and Hui people.

Economy 

The Qarhan Playa has China's largest reserves of salt, potassium, and magnesium, as well as other valuable minerals. Taken together, the mineral resources in the playa were estimated to be worth over 15 trillion renminbi (RMB) as of 2002. The area's salt has also trapped valuable hydrocarbons. The Sebei-1 and Sebei-2 fields near Suli Lake are also China's 4th-largest onshore reserves of natural gas and the entire area may have reserves as high as 1 trillion m³ (35 trillion cu. ft.). The larger Sanhu Depression includes East and West Taijinar, which hold China's largest reserves of lithium.

The surrounding countryside also produces gold, copper, jade, lead, and zinc.

A pipeline delivers crude oil from Huatugou Oilfield to a refinery at Golmud. The refinery has a capacity of 1 million metric tons a year; is able to produce 100,000 metric tons a year of methanol and 20,000 MT/yr of polypropylene; and has a 100,000 MT/yr gas fractionator.

According to the National Ethnic Affairs Commission, the per capita disposable income in Golmud was 6,852 yuan in the first quarter of 2017, a 9.3% increase from the one year prior. Golmud has been one of the areas included in China's Targeted Poverty Alleviation program, which the Commission states has entailed the reconstruction of houses in the city with subpar living conditions, and subsidizing low-income students in the city. The Commission also states that the government has been developing the production of traditional woodworking, embroidery, and other local crafts through designated "demonstration areas". 

Statistics for 2001 show that the city's nominal GDP totaled 2.213 billion RMB, a rise of 31.9% from the previous year and the highest growth rate since 1990.

Transportation

Railway 

Golmud lies along the Qinghai–Tibet railway, a  railway that starts from Xining and ends at Lhasa in the Tibet Autonomous Region. After five years of construction, the first train for Lhasa left Golmud on 1 July 2006.

In October 2012 construction started on the Golmud–Dunhuang Railway. It will actually branch off the Qinghai–Tibet Railway at the Yinmaxia station north of Golmud, and will cross the Qaidam Basin and the Altyn-Tagh/Qilian system on the way to Dunhuang in the neighboring Gansu province.

The Golmud-Korla Railway running north west from Golmud into Korla, Xinjiang began construction in November 2014 and was completed in 2020.

Highways 
The Golmud-Lhasa highway, extending , is part of the 1,930-km Qinghai-Tibet highway (China National Highway 109) connecting Xining and Lhasa.
China National Highway 215, runs north from Golmud to Dunhuang, Gansu

Airport

 Golmud Airport

Twin cities 
 Bharatpur, Nepal
 Dobrich, Bulgaria
 Kiryat Malakhi, Israel

In popular culture 
The Golmud Railway is featured as an online multiplayer map in the video game Battlefield 4.

References

Citations

Bibliography
 .
 .

External links
Official website (Chinese)

Cities in Qinghai
Populated places in Tibet
Haixi Mongol and Tibetan Autonomous Prefecture